William Harrison Dixon (6 May 1905 – 23 February 1956) was an English professional footballer who played as a wing half.

References

1905 births
1956 deaths
Footballers from Grimsby
English footballers
Association football wing halves
Middlesbrough F.C. players
Craghead United F.C. players
Grimsby Town F.C. players
Barrow A.F.C. players
Boston Town F.C. players
Bridlington Town A.F.C. players
English Football League players